Donald Richie Taylor (December 13, 1920 – December 29, 1998) was an American actor and film director. He co-starred in 1940s and 1950s classics, including the 1948 film noir The Naked City, Battleground, Father of the Bride, Father's Little Dividend and Stalag 17. He later turned to directing films such as Escape from the Planet of the Apes (1971), Tom Sawyer (1973), Echoes of a Summer (1976) and Damien: Omen II (1978).

Biography

Early life and work
The son of Mr. and Mrs. D. E. Taylor, Donald Ritchie Taylor was born in Freeport, Pennsylvania on December 13, 1920. (Another source says that he was born "in Pittsburgh and raised in Freeport, Pa.") He studied speech and drama at Penn State University and hitchhiked to Hollywood in 1942. He was signed as a contract player at Metro-Goldwyn-Mayer and appeared in small roles. Drafted into the United States Army Air Forces (AAF) during World War II, he appeared in the Air Forces's Winged Victory Broadway play and movie (1944), credited as "Cpl. Don Taylor."

Acting career 
After discharge from the AAF, Taylor was cast in a lead role as the young detective, Jimmy Halloran, working alongside veteran homicide detective Dan Muldoon (Barry Fitzgerald) in Universal's 1948 screen version of The Naked City, which was notable for being filmed entirely on location in New York. Taylor was later part of the ensemble cast in MGM's classic World War II drama Battleground (1949).  He then appeared as the husband of Elizabeth Taylor in the comedies Father of the Bride (1950) and its sequel Father's Little Dividend (1951), starring Spencer Tracy. Another memorable role was Vern "Cowboy" Blithe in Flying Leathernecks (1951). In 1952, Taylor played a soldier bringing his Japanese war-bride back to small-town America in Japanese War Bride. In 1953, Taylor had a key role as the escaping prisoner Lt. Dunbar in Billy Wilder's Stalag 17. His last major film role came in I'll Cry Tomorrow (1955).

Directorial career
From the late 1950s through the 1980s, Taylor turned to directing movies and TV shows, such as Alfred Hitchcock Presents, the short-lived Steve Canyon, starring Dean Fredericks, and Rod Serling's Night Gallery.  One of his memorable efforts, in 1973, was the musical film Tom Sawyer, which boasted a Sherman Brothers song score. Other films that Taylor directed are Escape from the Planet of the Apes (1971), Echoes of a Summer (1976), The Great Scout & Cathouse Thursday (also 1976), The Island of Dr. Moreau (1977) starring Burt Lancaster, Damien: Omen II (1978) with William Holden, and The Final Countdown (1980) with Kirk Douglas.

Taylor occasionally performed both acting and directing roles simultaneously, as he did for episodes of the TV detective series Burke's Law.

Writing career
Taylor "wrote one-act plays, radio dramas, short stories, and the 1985 TV movie My Wicked, Wicked Ways ... The Legend of Errol Flynn."

Personal life

Taylor was married twice.
 His first wife was Phyllis Avery, whom he married in 1944; they divorced in 1955, but not before the births of their daughters Anne and Avery.
 His second wife was Hazel Court, whom he married in 1964 and stayed with until his death; they had a son, Jonathan, and a daughter, Courtney.

Death
Taylor died on December 29, 1998, at the University of California Medical Center in Los Angeles, California, of heart failure.

Awards
 Nominee, Best Director – Saturn Awards (The Island of Dr. Moreau) (1977) 
 Nominee, Best Director-Comedy – Emmy Awards (The Farmer's Daughter) (1963)

Selected filmography as director
In addition to his Hollywood credits, Taylor directed 27 television movies and episodes for 53 television series including Cannon, Rod Serling's Night Gallery, Mod Squad, It Takes a Thief, The Big Valley, The Flying Nun, Vacation Playhouse, The Tammy Grimes Show,  The Wild Wild West, Burke's Law, The Rogues, The Farmer's Daughter, The Lloyd Bridges Show, The Dick Powell Theatre, Dr. Kildare, Checkmate, 87th Precinct, Zane Grey Theater, The Rifleman, Alfred Hitchcock Presents, Honky Tonk, and others.Everything's Ducky (1961)Ride the Wild Surf (1964)Jack of Diamonds (1967)The Five Man Army (1969)Escape from the Planet of the Apes (1971)Tom Sawyer (1973)Echoes of a Summer (1976)The Great Scout & Cathouse Thursday (1976)The Island of Dr. Moreau (1977)Damien: Omen II (1978)The Final Countdown (1980)The Diamond Trap'' (1988)

Selected filmography as actor

References

External links

 
 
 
 

1920 births
1998 deaths
Pennsylvania State University alumni
American male television actors
American male film actors
American television directors
American male stage actors
United States Army Air Forces soldiers
United States Army personnel of World War II
Metro-Goldwyn-Mayer contract players
Burials at Westwood Village Memorial Park Cemetery
20th-century American male actors
People from Freeport, Pennsylvania
Film directors from Pennsylvania